I Promise is a 1994 Austrian drama film directed by Wolfgang Murnberger. The film was selected as the Austrian entry for the Best Foreign Language Film at the 67th Academy Awards, but was not accepted as a nominee.

Cast
 Christoph Dostal as Berger
 Andreas Lust as Rumpler
 Andreas Simma as Moser
 Marcus J. Carney as Kernstock
 Leopold Altenburg as Tomschitz
 Albert Weilguny as Vizeleutnant Pfister
 Johannes Kollmann as Wachtmeister Ernst
 Robert Taurer as Leutnant Ressl

See also
 List of submissions to the 67th Academy Awards for Best Foreign Language Film
 List of Austrian submissions for the Academy Award for Best Foreign Language Film

References

External links
 

1994 films
1994 drama films
1990s German-language films
Austrian drama films